Mission Rabies is a charity that was initially founded as an initiative by Worldwide Veterinary Service (WVS), a United Kingdom-based charity group that assists animals. Mission Rabies has a One Health approach driven by research to eliminate dog bite transmitted rabies (a disease that is estimated to kill 59,000 people annually).  Launched in September 2013 with a mission to vaccinate 50,000 dogs against rabies across India, Mission Rabies teams have since then vaccinated 968,287 dogs and educated 2,330,597 children in dog bite prevention in rabies endemic countries.

Geographic scope
The organisation has worked in Kerala, Tamil Nadu, Andhra Pradesh, Maharashtra, Orissa, West Bengal, Jharkhand, Rajasthan, Goa and Assam.

References

Further reading

External links

Veterinary medicine in India
Non-profit organisations based in the United Kingdom
Rabies